Mina alla Bussola dal vivo is Italian singer Mina's first live album.
Mina was the first Italian woman to record a live album during her performance at the Bussola, a popular night club in Marina di Pietrasanta, Versilia, Tuscany, Italy. She recorded this live in occasion of tenth year of her smashing career.

Track listing

Personnel 
Augusto Martelli - conductor
Rolando Ceragioli, drums; Loreto Ficorilli, percussion
Pino Presti, electric bass 
Felice Daccò, electric guitar; Ernesto Massimo Verardi, electric & acoustic guitar
Alberto Baldan, organ; Gianni Zilioli, piano 
Al Corvini, Fermo Lini, Oscar Valdambrini, trumpets
Gianni Caranti, Nicola Castriotta, Enos Patracchini, Dino Piana, trombones
Gianni Bedori, saxophones, flutes; Glauco Masetti, alto sax; Sergio Rigon, alto sax, flute, bassoon; Sergio Valenti, baritone saxophone, alto sax; Eraldo Volonté, tenor sax, clarinet

Mina (Italian singer) live albums
1968 live albums
Italian-language live albums